The Democratic Party of Chile (PADECH) was a Chilean political party that had legal existence from 1988 to 1989 under the state of "party in formation".

It was originally created by Apolonides Parra to rally the militants of the National Democratic Party (PADENA) who rejected the decision of the collectivity to support the "No" option in the plebiscite of 1988. PADECH started preparations for its establishment on 16 June 1988 and was declared as a "party in formation" July 27 of that year. It openly supported the option "Yes" in the referendum which sought the continuation of the dictatorship of Augusto Pinochet on October 5 of that year.

In late 1988 it created the short-lived Democratic Confederation (Confederación Democrática) with the National Party (a faction that supported Pinochet), the Radical Democracy, the Social Democrat Party, the National Advance, the Liberal Democrat Party of Chile, the Free Democratic Centre and the Civic Committees. The confederation disappeared in 1989 during negotiations for parliamentary candidates that year.

Aftet the "No" option victory in the referendum, the party was finally dissolved by the Electoral Service on 27 February 1989. for not complying with the legal requirements, and many of its members joined the National Renewal (RN).

References 

Defunct political parties in Chile
Political parties established in 1988
Political parties disestablished in 1989
1988 establishments in Chile
1989 disestablishments in Chile